Zdbino  (German: Stabenow Ziegelei) is a former settlement in the administrative district of Gmina Recz, within Choszczno County, West Pomeranian Voivodeship, in north-western Poland.

See also
 History of Pomerania.

References

Zdbino